Héctor Eduardo Berrios Ibarra (born 18 October 1986) is a Chilean professional footballer who plays as a midfielder for Deportes Iquique.

Honours
Deportes Melipilla
Primera B: 2004, 2006

Universidad de Concepción
 Copa Chile: 2014–15

External links
 
 

1986 births
Living people
Chilean footballers
Association football midfielders
Chilean Primera División players
Primera B de Chile players
Cobresal footballers
Deportes Melipilla footballers
Deportes Concepción (Chile) footballers
Universidad de Concepción footballers
Deportes Iquique footballers